Halls of Montezuma: A Battle History of the U.S. Marine Corps is a video game developed by Strategic Studies Group in 1987 for the Apple II. Ports were later released for the Commodore 64, Amiga, DOS, and Apple IIGS. Halls of Montezuma is a war simulation game that offers all of the major battles involving the U.S. Marine Corps.

Gameplay
A written and on-disk tutorial is provided to help players learn how to manage the various menus that control the game. This package offers a complete graphics editor and wargame construction set.

Reception
In 1988, Dragon gave the game 4 out of 5 stars. Johnny L. Wilson reviewed the game for Computer Gaming World, and stated that "HOM does not allow players to be the 'god of the battlefield,' but it sure offers an Olympian challenge."

In a 1990 survey of wargames Computer Gaming World gave the game three-plus stars out of five, in 1993 three stars, and in 1994 two-plus stars.

Reviews
ACE (Advanced Computer Entertainment) - May, 1989
Amiga Power - Aug, 1991
Computer and Video Games - Sep, 1988
Computer Gaming World - Nov, 1991
Amiga Power - Sep, 1991
Computer Gaming World - Mar, 1988

References

External links
Halls of Montezuma: A Battle History of the U.S. Marine Corps at MobyGames
Review in Compute!'s Gazette

1987 video games
Apple II games
Apple IIGS games
Amiga games
Commodore 64 games
DOS games
Korean War video games
Strategic Studies Group games
Video games about the United States Marine Corps
Video games developed in Australia
World War I video games
World War II grand strategy computer games